Darius was crown prince of the Persian Empire. He was the eldest son of the Persian king Xerxes I and his wife Amestris, the daughter of Onophas. His younger brothers were Hystaspes and Artaxerxes, and his younger sisters were Rhodogyne and Amytis.

Circa 478 BC, before the revolt at Bactria, Darius was married to his cousin Artaynte at Sardis. She was the daughter of his uncle Masistes. At the behest of Xerxes, Artaynte committed adultery with him (Xerxes). When Amestris found out, she did not seek revenge against Artaynte, but against her mother, Masistes' wife, as Amestris thought that it was due to her connivance. On Xerxes' birthday, Amestris sent for his guards and mutilated Artaynte's mother. On seeing this, Masistes fled to Bactria to start a revolt, but was intercepted by Xerxes' army who killed him and his sons.

In 465 BC, Darius may have ascended to the throne as King of Persia after his father was murdered in a conspiracy carried out by Artabanus and Aspamitres the eunuch, who were confidential advisers of Xerxes. Afterwards, they deceived Artaxerxes into believing that it was his older brother, Darius, who murdered his father. Darius was then taken to the palace of Artaxerxes and put to death.

Artabanus may have had personal ambitions for the throne since, subsequently, he conspired with Megabyzus to have Artaxerxes killed. But Megabyzus revealed the plot to Artaxerxes, who put Artabanus and Aspamitres to death for the murders of Xerxes, Darius and his own attempted murder. Artabanus was killed by sword, whilst Aspamitres was left in a tub where he was eaten by insects.

Classical sources 
 Ctesias, Persica, books XIV - XVII
 Diodorus of Sicily, Bibliotheca historica, XI, 69
 Herodotus, Histories, book IX

Bibliography 
 Jacoby, Felix. (1923-1959) Die Fragmente er griechischen Historiker, Berlin
 Jacoby, Felix. (1922) "Ktesias", RE XI, 2032-2073
 Henry, René. (1959) Photius: La Bibliothèque, Paris
 Lenfant, Dominique. (2004) Ctésias. La Perse. L’Inde. Autres fragments. Paris

External links
 Photius' Excerpt of Ctesias' Persica

Notes

465 BC deaths
5th-century BC Iranian people
5th-century BC rulers
Achaemenid princes
Heirs apparent who never acceded